Savvy & Mandy are a country-pop duo from Southern California in the United States. Savvy and Mandy are sisters, Savannah Shay Burhoe (born August 10, 1993) and Amanda Quinn Burhoe (born October 12, 1995). The Burhoe sisters professional career began with acting and modeling at the ages of 9 and 11.

Background

The Burhoe sisters began singing together as children and formed the duo Savvy & Mandy after they both learned to play guitar. They began recording their debut release on the Firm Music label in 2007 with The Collective (T-Squad) and Ken Hauptmann as well as Colleen Fitzpatrick (Vitamin C). In October 2007 they released a digital-only EP entitled Christmas in California which was featured on the ym.com website's What’s Hot This Week on November 6, 2007

"Waiting for the Heartbreak", their debut single, was featured on the MTV series Newport Harbor: The Real Orange County, episode 201, "Are We or Aren't We". It won Radio Disney's Music Mailbag on January 19, 2008, earning them online and regional airplay on Radio Disney stations. The song also received airplay on AOL Radio's Kid station and Yahoo!'s Launchcast Radio. It was featured on the iTunes home page from January 15 to January 22 and on the iTunes Pop page. In December 2007 they performed at the ProScout Talent Conference in Anaheim, California. They performed at the International Family Film festival on March 2, 2008, in Hollywood, Los Angeles, California.

The Burhoes are part of the Milkrocks program to bring music to children in school in the United States through milk cartons and have previously appeared in a variety of catalog and print ads including Pottery Barn Kids.

Discography

EP
 2007: Christmas in California
 2008: Here We Are

Singles
 2008: "Waiting For The Heartbreak"
 2008: "Here I Am"
 2009: "This Is Me"
 2010: "Favorite Song"
 2010: "Words"
 2010: "Save Me" (Produced by: Manny Streetz of Silent String Entertainment and Eddie Galan & Alex Niceforo of Mach 1 Music)
 2011: "Rumors"
 2018: "Do You Lie Awake At Night"

Other songs 
 "What You See Is What You Get"
 "Shell Shocked"
 "Heart Broken" duets album

References

External links
Official Website

Musical groups established in 2007
American pop music groups
Sibling musical duos
American pop girl groups
All-female bands
Musical groups from California
American child singers